Churchill County is a county in the western U.S. state of Nevada. As of the 2020 census, the population was 25,516. Its county seat is Fallon. Named for Mexican–American War hero brevet Brigadier General Sylvester Churchill, the county was formed in 1861. Churchill County comprises the Fallon, NV Micropolitan Statistical Area. It is in northwestern Nevada. Churchill County is noteworthy in that it owns and operates the local telephone carrier, Churchill County Communications.

History
Churchill County was established in 1861, and was named for Fort Churchill (which is now in Lyon County), which was named for General Sylvester Churchill, a Mexican–American War hero who was Inspector General of the U.S. Army in 1861. Churchill County was not organized until 1864, and its first county seat was Bucklands (which is now in Lyon County). In 1864 the county seat was moved to La Plata; in 1868 it was moved to Stillwater; and in 1904 it was settled in its present position, Fallon. In the 19th century there were several attempts to eliminate Churchill County because of its small population, but Assemblyman Lemuel Allen stopped it on all occasions including convincing the Governor to veto an 1875 bill after it had been passed by both houses.

Railroads

The Central Pacific portion of the nation's first transcontinental railroad ran through Churchill County, although a portion of the original route has been shifted for a new route south of Wadsworth in favor of Fernley. The Central Pacific later became the Southern Pacific Railroad which was merged into Union Pacific in 1996.

Geography
The terrain of Churchill County consists of rugged mountainous ridges, dotted with lakes and ponds. The county's east and west sides are higher than the intermediate valley; its highest point around the county periphery is a ridge on the lower east boundary line, at 9,380' (2859m) ASL. The county's highest point is Desatoya Peak at 9,977' (3041m), while the most topographically prominent peak is Mount Augusta, at 9,970' (3039m) ASL.

Major highways

  Interstate 11 (Future)
  Interstate 80
  U.S. Route 50
  U.S. Route 50 Alternate
  U.S. Route 95
  U.S. Route 95 Alternate
  State Route 115
  State Route 116
  State Route 117
  State Route 118
  State Route 119
  State Route 120
  State Route 121
  State Route 361
  State Route 715
  State Route 718
  State Route 720
  State Route 722
  State Route 723
  State Route 726
  State Route 839

Adjacent counties

 Lyon County – west
 Washoe County – northwest
 Pershing County – north
 Lander County – east
 Nye County – southeast
 Mineral County – south

Protected areas

 Fallon National Wildlife Refuge
 Humboldt State Wildlife Management Area
 Lahontan State Game Refuge
 Lahontan State Recreation Area (partial)
 Sand Mountain Recreation Area
 Stillwater National Wildlife Refuge

Lakes and reservoirs

 Big Water
 Carson Lake
 Cattail Lake
 Division Lake
 Dog Head Pond
 Dry Lake
 Dutch Bill Lake
 East Alkali Lake Number One
 East Alkali Lake Number Two
 Foxtail Lake
 Goose Lake
 Humboldt Lake (partial)
 Lahontan Reservoir
 Little Soda Lake
 North Nutgrass Lake
 Pintail Bay
 Scheckler Reservoir
 Soda Lake
 Stillwater Point Reservoir
 Swan Check
 Swan Lake
 Tule Lake
 West Nutgrass
 Willow Lake

Demographics

2000 census
As of the 2000 United States Census, the county had 23,982 people, 8,912 households, and 6,461 families. The population density was 5 people per square mile (2/km2). There were 9,732 housing units at an average density of 2 per square mile (1/km2).

The country's racial makeup was 84.2% White, 1.6% Black or African American, 4.8% Native American, 2.7% Asian, 0.2% Pacific Islander, 3.2% from other races, and 3.3% from two or more races. 8.7% of the population were Hispanic or Latino of any race.

There were 8,912 households, of which 37.2% had children under the age of 18 living with them, 57.7% were married couples living together, 10.4% had a female householder with no husband present, and 27.5% were non-families. 22.0% of all households were made up of individuals, and 8.5% had someone living alone who was 65 years of age or older. The average household size was 2.64 and the average family size was 3.09.

28.0% of the county's population was under age 18, 8.1% was from age 18 to 24, 28.7% was from age 25 to 44, 22.3% was from age 45 to 64, and 11.9% was age 65 or older. The median age was 35 years. For every 100 females there were 100.6 males. For every 100 females age 18 and over, there were 99.1 males.

The country's median household income was $40,808 and the median family income was $46,624. Males had a median income of $36,478 versus $25,000 for females. The county's per capita income was $19,264. About 6.2% of families and 8.7% of the population were below the poverty line, including 10.8% of those under age 18 and 7.0% of those age 65 or over.

2010 census
As of the 2010 United States Census, the county had 24,877 people, 9,671 households, and 6,631 families.

The county's racial makeup was 82.0% white, 4.5% American Indian, 2.7% Asian, 1.6% black or African American, 0.2% Pacific islander, 4.8% from other races, and 4.2% from two or more races. Those of Hispanic or Latino origin made up 12.1% of the population. In terms of ancestry, 19.2% were English, 18.8% were German, 13.6% were Irish, 6.5% were Italian, and 5.9% were American.

Of the 9,671 households, 33.2% had children under the age of 18 living with them, 52.0% were married couples living together, 11.3% had a female householder with no husband present, 31.4% were non-families, and 25.2% of all households were made up of individuals. The average household size was 2.53 and the average family size was 3.01. The median age was 39.0 years.

The county's median household income was $51,597 and the median family income was $63,599. Males had a median income of $45,057 versus $32,550 for females. The county's per capita income was $22,997. About 6.8% of families and 8.8% of the population were below the poverty line, including 7.3% of those under age 18 and 10.4% of those age 65 or over.

Communities

City
 Fallon

Census-designated place
 Fallon Station

Unincorporated communities

 Cold Springs
 Dixie Valley
 Eastgate
 Hazen
 Middlegate
 Stillwater

Politics
Lying on the boundary between the northwest urban areas of Nevada and the conservative Mormon Great Basin, Churchill County has more in common with the latter region, being overwhelmingly Republican. It was one of three Nevada counties Barry Goldwater won in 1964, and since that time only Jimmy Carter in 1976 and Barack Obama in 2008 have passed so much as thirty percent of the county's ballots. The last time Churchill County voted for a Democratic presidential candidate was when it supported Franklin D. Roosevelt against Wendell Willkie in 1940.

See also
 National Register of Historic Places listings in Churchill County, Nevada
 USS Churchill County (LST-583)

Notes

Notable people
 Luella Kirkbride Drumm, the only woman to serve in the Nevada State Legislature in 1939.
 Mary Daisy White, one of the first women elected to the Nevada Assembly.

References

External links
 

 
1861 establishments in Nevada Territory
Populated places established in 1861